Xhafer bey Ypi ( January 12, 1880, Starje – December 17, 1940) was an Albanian politician.

A member of the Ypi dynasty of Albania, he was educated at a university in Istanbul. In 1920–1921 he was Minister of Internal Affairs and Minister of Justice. He also held the position of Minister of Public Instruction.

As the leader of the Popular Party, in late December 1921 he formed a government where Fan S. Noli was the Minister of Foreign Affairs and Ahmed Zogu was the Minister of Internal Affairs. Until December 4, 1922, Ypi was Prime Minister; in 1922, after Noli's resignation, he was also acting Minister of Foreign Affairs.

From December 2, 1922, to January 31, 1925, Ypi was a member of the High Council (the collegial Head of State, formally for William of Wied). In June 1924 he left Albania because of Noli's revolt, but he kept holding the post formally.

During Zogu's reign, Ypi was Chief Inspector of the Royal Court.
After King Zog had fled after Italian occupation, from April 9 to April 12 Ypi was Chairman and Plenipotentiary for Justice of the Provisional Administration Committee, and as such acting head of state. From April 12, he was the Minister of Justice in Shefqet Verlaci's government. He was killed near his hometown by an aerial bomb during the Greco-Italian War. His great-granddaughter is the Albanian philosopher and writer Lea Ypi.

See also
 History of Albania

Sources
 O.S. Pearson, Albania and King Zog, I.B. Tauris. 2005.

References

1880 births
1940 deaths
People from Kolonjë
Albanian Sufis
Albanian Fascist Party politicians
Government ministers of Albania
Prime Ministers of Albania
Albanian collaborators with Fascist Italy
Albanian diplomats
Bektashi Order
Second Congress of Manastir delegates
Justice ministers of Albania
Interior ministers of Albania
State auditors of Albania
Xhafer